Homerville Airport  is a city-owned public-use airport located two nautical miles (3.7 km) northwest of the central business district of Homerville, a city in Clinch County, Georgia, United States.

Although many U.S. airports use the same three-letter location identifier for the FAA and IATA, this facility is assigned HOE by the FAA but has no designation from the IATA.

History
The airport was built by the United States Army Air Forces about 1942, and was known as Homerville Flight Strip.  It was an emergency landing airfield for military aircraft on training flights.  It was closed after World War II, and was turned over for local government use by the War Assets Administration (WAA).

Facilities and aircraft 
It has one runway designated 14/32 with an asphalt surface measuring 4,000 by 75 feet (1,219 x 23 m). For the 12-month period ending August 26, 2008, the airport had 1,300 general aviation aircraft operations, an average of 108 per month.

References

External links 

 Aerial image as of 17 January 1993 from USGS The National Map
 

Airports in Georgia (U.S. state)
Airfields of the United States Army Air Forces in Georgia (U.S. state)
Buildings and structures in Clinch County, Georgia
Flight Strips of the United States Army Air Forces
World War II airfields in the United States
Transportation in Clinch County, Georgia